Nana Sir Ofori Atta I, KBE (11 October 1881 – 21 August 1943) was the Okyenhene or King of the Akyem people and of Akyem Abuakwa, a traditional kingdom that stretches back to the thirteenth century and was one of the most influential kingdoms of the then Gold Coast Colony. He ruled from his election in 1912 until his death in 1943.

Ofori Atta was educated in Basel Mission schools and at its Akuropon seminary, now named the Presbyterian College of Education, Akropong. He left the seminary after two years to work as a solicitor's clerk, and then served in the West African Frontier Force, fighting during the Yaa Asantewaa War. Elected Omanhene of Akyem Abuakwa in 1912, he became a member of the Legislative Council in 1916.

In 1934, he led a Gold Coast Delegation to London to petition the British Parliament for official majority of Africans on the legislative council, permanent African representative on the Governor's executive council and eligibility for non-chiefs to be provincial members of the executive council. He was also instrumental in setting up multiple schools, including Achimota School or College (formerly Prince of Wales School), where most colonial Gold Coast leaders and current prominent Ghanaian leaders schooled.

"Ofori Atta was the son of a senior official of the palace; his mother was the descendant of one of the founders of the kingdom.... Once in power, he was determined to return Akyem Abuakwa to its former glory."

He created the Ofori-Atta dynasty by privileging education both amongst his sons and daughters, through two paths, “one firmly rooted in a concern for binding the state by the traditionally sanctioned method of multiple marriage and the other rooted in his strong case for ‘modernisation’ and ‘progress’.”

Family

He was the brother of Dr J. B. Danquah (a founding member of the United Gold Coast Convention). He was the father of Aaron Ofori-Atta, (the fourth Speaker of the Parliament of Ghana, a Minister of Communications and Minister of Local Government), Adeline Akufo-Addo, (First Lady under the Second Republic), William Ofori Atta (a Minister of Foreign Affairs, Presidential Candidate of the UNC), Dr Kwesi Amoako-Atta (Governor of Bank of Ghana and Minister for Finance and Economic Planning under the First Republic), Dr Jones Ofori Atta (Deputy Minister for Finance and Economic Planning under the Busia government), and Susan Ofori-Atta (the first female doctor in Ghana). He was the grandfather of Nana Addo Dankwa Akufo-Addo, (Current President of Ghana), Ken Ofori-Atta, (Ghana's current Minister for Finance and Economic Planning and founder of the Databank Group), Osagyefuo Amoatia Ofori Panin (the Okyenhene, current King of Akyem Abuakwa), Samuel Atta Akyea (Minister of Works and Housing) and the writer Nana Oforiatta Ayim.

References

1881 births
1943 deaths
20th-century rulers in Africa
Akan people
Ghanaian Freemasons
Ghanaian Presbyterians
Ghanaian Protestants
History of Ghana
British colonial army soldiers
Knights Commander of the Order of the British Empire
1
Ghanaian royalty
Presbyterian College of Education, Akropong alumni